Richie Barnett (born 21 April 1971) is a New Zealand former professional rugby league footballer who played in the 1990s and 2000s. A New Zealand international representative , he also captained the side during his career, during which he played for clubs in New Zealand, Australia and England. Following his playing career he became a columnist for The New Zealand Herald. In August 2021, it was announced that he would feature in the 2021 Season of 
Celebrity Treasure Island 2021.

Playing career
While playing in New Zealand Barnett was selected to play in the 1992 Pacific Cup for the New Zealand Māori side. He joined Sydney club, Cronulla-Sutherland Sharks in 1994. The following year Barnett was selected to represent New Zealand at the 1995 World Cup. He was selected for New Zealand in the 1996 Super League World Nines tournament. He was selected to play at fullback for the Kiwis in the 1997 ANZAC Test. He also played in the 1997 Super League World Nines.

Barnett left the Sharks for cross-town rivals, the Sydney Roosters for the 1998 season. That year he was selected to go on the 1998 New Zealand rugby league tour of Great Britain and played at fullback in all three Tests, scoring two tries. The following year he was selected for the New Zealand team to compete in the end of season 1999 Rugby League Tri-Nations tournament. Barnett's 2000 season was cut short by a facial fracture he suffered during the 2000 ANZAC Test. He recovered in time to be selected to captain New Zealand from fullback at the 2000 World Cup. Barnett was succeeded as captain of New Zealand by Nathan Cayless.

After his NRL career ended, he played for the London Broncos in the Super League until 2002, and later Hull F.C. (Heritage № 1003) in 2003-04.

Later years
He currently works as a broadcaster for SKY Network Television.

Health
In the early 21st century, Barnett developed ME/CFS and has said that the condition was the reason for his retirement. In July 2015, he described himself as 80% recovered. In 2000, he sustained a facial injury during a match and had to have surgery that involved having 10 plates inserted into his skull. He has stated that he would rather go through that surgery again, than live with ME/CFS once more. He is the face of the Associated New Zealand ME Society (ANZMES).

References

External links
 SL stats
 NRL stats
 Hull sign Broncos ace Barnett
 Barnett leads London fight
 Barnett predicts tough battle
 Barnett eyes cross-code switch
 (archived by web.archive.org) Stats → PastPlayers → B at hullfc.com
 (archived by web.archive.org) Statistics at hullfc.com
London Broncos profile

1972 births
Living people
Auckland rugby league team players
Cronulla-Sutherland Sharks players
Hull F.C. players
London Broncos players
New Zealand Māori rugby league players
New Zealand Māori rugby league team players
New Zealand national rugby league team captains
New Zealand national rugby league team players
New Zealand rugby league commentators
New Zealand rugby league players
Otahuhu Leopards players
People with chronic fatigue syndrome
Rugby league fullbacks
Rugby league players from Auckland
Sydney Roosters players